The fourth cabinet of Ion C. Brătianu ruled Romania from 9 June 1881 to 20 March 1888.

Ministers
The ministers of the cabinet were as follows:

President of the Council of Ministers:
Ion C. Brătianu (9 June 1881 - 20 March 1888)
Minister of the Interior: 
Constantin A. Rosetti (9 June 1881 - 25 January 1882)
Ion C. Brătianu (25 January - 1 August 1882)
Gheorghe Chițu (1 August 1882 - 23 June 1884)
Ion C. Brătianu (23 June 1884 - 29 April 1887)
Gen. Radu Mihai (29 April 1887 - 1 March 1888)
(interim) Constantin Nacu (1 - 20 March 1888)
Minister of Foreign Affairs: 
Eugeniu Stătescu (9 June 1881 - 1 August 1882)
Dimitrie A. Sturdza (1 August 1882 - 2 February 1885)
Ion Câmpineanu (2 February - 28 October 1885)
(interim) Ion C. Brătianu (28 October - 16 December 1885)
Mihail Pherekyde (16 December 1885 - 20 March 1888)
Minister of Finance:
Ion C. Brătianu (9 June - 1 December 1881)
Gheorghe Chițu (1 December 1881 - 25 January 1882)
George Lecca (25 January 1882 - 13 September 1885)
(interim) Constantin Nacu (13 September - 16 December 1885)
Constantin Nacu (16 December 1885 - 1 March 1888)
Dimitrie A. Sturdza (1 - 20 March 1888)
Minister of Justice:
Mihail Pherekyde (9 June - 16 November 1881)
(interim) Eugeniu Stătescu (16 November 1881 - 25 January 1882)
Gheorghe Chițu (25 January - 1 August 1882)
Eugeniu Stătescu (1 August 1882 - 30 September 1883)
(interim) Gheorghe Chițu (30 September - 15 November 1883)
Nicolae Voinov (15 November 1883 - 14 January 1885)
(interim) Ion Câmpineanu (14 January - 2 February 1885)
Constantin Nacu (2 February - 16 December 1885)
Eugeniu Stătescu (16 December 1885 - 1 March 1888)
Dimitrie Gianni (1 - 20 March 1888)
Minister of War:
(interim) Ion C. Brătianu (9 June - 1 December 1881)
Ion C. Brătianu (1 December 1881 - 25 January 1882)
Gen. Gheorghe Angelescu (25 January - 1 August 1882)
Ion C. Brătianu (1 August 1882 - 23 June 1884)
Gen. Ștefan Fălcoianu (23 June 1884 - 13 January 1886)
(interim) Ion C. Brătianu (13 January - 21 February 1886)
Gen. Alexandru Anghelescu (21 February 1886 - 5 November 1887)
(interim) Ion C. Brătianu (5 November 1887 - 20 March 1888)
Minister of Religious Affairs and Public Instruction:
Vasile Alexandrescu Urechia (9 June 1881 - 1 August 1882)
Petre S. Aurelian (1 August 1882 - 23 June 1884)
Gheorghe Chițu (23 June 1884 - 2 February 1885)
Dimitrie A. Sturdza (2 February 1885 - 1 March 1888)
Constantin Nacu (1 - 20 March 1888)
Minister of Public Works:
Gen. Nicolae Dabija (9 June 1881 - 1 August 1884)
(interim) Dimitrie A. Sturdza (1 August 1884 - 2 February 1885)
Gen. Radu Mihai (2 February 1885 - 29 April 1887)
Petre S. Aurelian (29 April 1887 - 20 March 1888)
Minister of Agriculture, Trade, Industry and Commerce:
Ion Câmpineanu (1 April 1883 - 2 February 1885)
Anastase Stolojan (2 February 1885 - 17 October 1886)
(interim) Ion C. Brătianu (17 October 1886 - 29 April 1887)
Vasile Gheorghian (29 April 1887 - 1 March 1888)
Nicolae Gane (1 - 20 March 1888)

References

Cabinets of Romania
Cabinets established in 1881
Cabinets disestablished in 1888
1881 establishments in Romania
1888 disestablishments in Romania